The 1940–41 William & Mary Indians men's basketball team represented the College of William & Mary in intercollegiate basketball during the 1940–41 season. Under the second year of head coach Dwight Steussey, the team finished the season 15–10 and 8–3 in the Southern Conference. This was the 36th season of the collegiate basketball program at William & Mary, whose nickname is now the Tribe.

The Indians finished in a tie for 2nd place in the conference and qualified for the 1941 Southern Conference men's basketball tournament at Thompson Gym in Raleigh, North Carolina. This was the Indians' first-ever conference tournament appearance. Additionally, the team recorded the program's first-ever conference tournament victory with a win over Wake Forest in the first round. However, the Indians lost to Duke, the eventual champions, in the semifinals.

The Indians played several teams for the first time this season, including Xavier, Miami (OH), and Bradley.

Schedule

|-
!colspan=9 style="background:#006400; color:#FFD700;"| Regular season

|-
!colspan=9 style="background:#006400; color:#FFD700;"| Southern Conference Tournament

Source

References

William & Mary Tribe men's basketball seasons
William and Mary Indians
William and Mary Indians Men's Basketball Team
William and Mary Indians Men's Basketball Team